Kanpassorn Suriyasangpetch, nicknamed Eix, is a dentist and tech entrepreneur, founder of Ooca, an app to help those suffering from mental illness. She was listed on the BBC 100 Women for 2018.

Background 
Prior to founding Ooca, Suriyasangpetch served as a military dentist in the Royal Thai Army.

Company 
Suriyasangpetch founded the smartphone app Ooca in 2017 to connect Thai patients with psychiatric help remotely, through video chats on mobile devices. She claims it served a gap in mental health care, describing that there are roughly 40x fewer psychologists available to those living in Thailand than in other parts of the developed world.

Awards and honors 

 2018 BBC World 100 Women
 2017 - World Summit Award for Ooca

References 

Kanpassorn Suriyasangpetch
Kanpassorn Suriyasangpetch
Living people
BBC 100 Women
1988 births